Adam Hildreth (born 25 March 1985 in Leeds, West Yorkshire, England) is a British entrepreneur. Hildreth co-founded data firm Dubit Limited when he was 14. Hildreth is also the founder and CEO of Crisp, a company that manages user-generated content on behalf of other companies.

According to the "Sunday Times Rich List 2014", Hildreth was worth £24 million as of 2014.
In a 2003 study of British millionaires of the future, Hildreth was predicted to be worth £40 million by the year 2020. Hildreth has been awarded the Yorkshire Young Achievers Award.

References

External links
Crisp official website
Dubit Limited official website

Further reading
}

Businesspeople from Leeds
Living people
1985 births